Kalateh-ye Khodadad (also Romanized as Kalāteh-ye Khodādād and Kalateh Khodadad; also known as Kalāt-e Khodādād, Khodādād, and Qalāteh Khūdādād) is a village in Shusef Rural District, Shusef District, Nehbandan County, South Khorasan Province, Iran. At the 2006 census, its population was 236, in 63 families.

References 

Populated places in Nehbandan County